This is a list of the songs that have reached number one on the Mahasz Rádiós Top 40 airplay chart during the 2020s. The issue date is the date the song began its run at number one during the decade.

See also
 List of artists who reached number one in Hungary
 List of number-one singles of the 2000s (Hungary)
 List of number-one singles of the 2010s (Hungary)

References
 Hungarian Airplay Chart - archives from 2002 to present

Hungary
Number-one singles
2020s